The English Woman's Journal was a periodical dealing primarily with female employment and equality issues.  It was established in 1858 by Barbara Bodichon, Matilda Mary Hays and Bessie Rayner Parkes.  Published monthly between March 1858 and August 1864, it cost 1 shilling. After 1860 the Journal was published by Victoria Press in London, which was run by Emily Faithfull (1835–1895). She employed women workers, contrary to current practice in that period.

Founders and aims
The Journal was established in 1858 by Barbara Bodichon, Matilda Mary Hays and Bessie Rayner Parkes, with others, Bodichon being the major shareholder and Samuel Courtauld also held shares. Parkes was the chief editor with Hays. Emily Davies (1830–1921) was editor of the Journal in 1863.

The Journal was intended as an organ for discussing female employment and equality issues concerning, in particular, manual or intellectual industrial employment, expansion of employment opportunities, and the reform of laws pertaining to the sexes. The journal also included literary and cultural reviews not directly related to its central interests.

It was "an important publication in social and feminist history",
and so was chosen as one of six periodicals and newspapers to be digitised by the Nineteenth-Century Serials Edition project, funded by the Arts and Humanities Research Council.

Like-minded women
The Langham Place group was the circle of like-minded women who gathered at 19 Langham Place, the Journal's office in Central London; it also included Helen Blackburn (1842–1903), Jessie Boucherett (1825–1905) and Emily Faithfull. Among the group's activities was the establishment of the Society for Promoting the Employment of Women (SPEW). SPEW aimed at preparing young women for wider employment opportunities, providing apprenticeships and technical training.

The English Woman's Journal was succeeded by The Englishwoman's Review, which started publication in 1866 and continued till 1910.

References

External links
English Woman's Journal (1858-1864)

1858 establishments in England
1864 disestablishments in England
Defunct women's magazines published in the United Kingdom
Feminism in England
Feminist magazines
Independent magazines
Magazines established in 1858
Magazines disestablished in 1864
Magazines published in London
Monthly magazines published in the United Kingdom